The Keeper of Lost Causes (Danish: Kvinden i buret), also known as Department Q: The Keeper of Lost Causes, is a 2013 Danish film directed by Mikkel Nørgaard. The movie is based on the novel by Jussi Adler-Olsen. It is the first film in the Department Q film series, followed by  The Absent One (2014) and A Conspiracy of Faith (2016).

Synopsis
Carl Mørck is demoted to Department Q, the cold case unit, after a raid he instigated goes wrong. One case, a suspected suicide, piques his interest. His investigations suggest that the victim, a rising politician named Merete Lynnggard, was actually kidnapped. Mørck ruffles feathers and is told to halt the investigation, but he and his assistant Assad persist.

As the duo investigate the case further, they get into trouble with Swedish police and are suspended, but they still continue to persevere in their investigation. Lynnggard is revealed to be imprisoned in a pressure chamber by a vengeful chef named Larsa.

Carl and Assad locate the pressure chamber and rescue Lynnggard as she is about to die, and they arrest Larsa. Because of their action and the prominence of the case, the police chief reinstates the duo as detectives.

Cast and characters
 Nikolaj Lie Kaas as Carl Mørck
 Fares Fares as Assad
 Sonja Richter as Merete Lynggaard
 Mikkel Følsgaard as Uffe Lynggaard
 Søren Pilmark as Marcus Jacobsen
 Troels Lyby as Hardy Henningsen
 Patricia Schumann as Søs Norup
 Eric Ericson as Johan Lundquist

Release
The film was first shown at the Gothenburg Film Festival in January 2013, followed by several more film festivals before its cinema release in Denmark on 3 October 2013. The film topped the local box office in 2013 with 725,000 Danish moviegoers buying tickets.

References

External links
 
 
 

2013 films
2013 crime thriller films
Danish crime thriller films
2010s Danish-language films
Films based on Danish novels
Films about kidnapping
Films about revenge
Police detective films
Department Q
Films produced by Peter Aalbæk Jensen
Films produced by Louise Vesth